Paula Piveni Piukala is a Tongan politician and Member of the Legislative Assembly of Tonga. He is a member of the Democratic Party of the Friendly Islands.

Piukala works in the information technology industry, including as a computer systems manager for Shoreline Group. In March 2005 he became a whistleblower against Shoreline, alleging financial mismanagement, falsified audits, and exorbitant salaries paid to the company's executives, which included Crown Prince Tupouto‘a (later George Tupou V). The allegations led to a court case and protests against Shoreline from the Human Rights and Democracy Movement. He later worked as director of Tonga Cable.

At the 2021 Tongan general election he sought the PTOA nomination for Tongatapu 7, but a factional dispute inside the PTOA saw him lose to Sione Sangster Saulala. He contested the election anyway, but lost. Following the election he challenged Saulala's election in court, resulting in the latter's election being voided for bribery. Piukala was elected in the subsequent 2022 Tongatapu 7 by-election.

References

Living people
Members of the Legislative Assembly of Tonga
Democratic Party of the Friendly Islands politicians
Year of birth missing (living people)